The 2015–16 Saint Peter's Peacocks men's basketball team represented Saint Peter's University during the 2015–16 NCAA Division I men's basketball season. The Peacocks, led by ninth year head coach John Dunne, played their home games at the Yanitelli Center and were members of the Metro Atlantic Athletic Conference. They finished the season 14–16, 12–8 in MAAC play to finish in a tie for fourth place. They lost in the quarterfinals of the MAAC tournament to Fairfield.

Roster

Schedule

|-
!colspan=9 style="background:#0000FF; color:#FFFFFF;"| Regular season

|-
!colspan=9 style="background:#0000FF; color:#FFFFFF;"| MAAC tournament

References

Saint Peter's Peacocks men's basketball seasons
Saint Peter's
Saint
Saint